Erfurt Nord station is a railway station in the northern part of Erfurt, capital city of Thuringia, Germany.

References

Nord
Buildings and structures in Erfurt